Jamar Wall (born January 10, 1988) is a gridiron football defensive back for the Calgary Stampeders of the Canadian Football League (CFL). He also was a member of the Houston Texans and Philadelphia Eagles of the National Football League (NFL). He played college football at Texas Tech.

Early years
Wall attended Plainview High School where he played as a running back, defensive back and punter. As a junior, he posted 308 carries for 2,024 yards, 28 touchdowns and 10 receptions for 113 yards.

As a senior, he received All-State honors after registering 2,735 rushing yards, 42 touchdowns, 2 interceptions and a punt returned for a touchdown, while leading the Class 4A in rushing yards and scoring. He was named to the Amarillo Globe-News Golden Spread Team and as its player of the year.

College career
Wall accepted a football scholarship from Texas Tech University. As a true freshman, he tallied 11 games, 12 tackles and 2 passes defensed. As a sophomore, he appeared in 13 games with 12 starts, registering 54 tackles, 5 interceptions (led the team) and 6 passes defensed, while receiving second-team All-Big 12 honors.

As a junior, he appeared in 13 games with 12 starts, collecting 62 tackles (one for loss), 2 interceptions and 11 passes defensed. As a senior, he started all 13 games, recording 58 tackles (2 for loss), 2 interceptions and 15 passes defensed. He was named the defensive MVP of the 2010 Alamo Bowl.

He finished his college career with 50 games (38 starts), 186 tackles (3 for loss), 9 interceptions, 34 passes defensed and 2 forced fumbles.

Professional career

Dallas Cowboys
Wall was selected by the Dallas Cowboys in the sixth round (196th overall) of the 2010 NFL Draft. He was signed to a four-year contract on July 21. He was waived during final roster cuts on September 4.

Houston Texans
He was claimed off waivers by the Houston Texans on September 5, 2010. He was only active in the team's season-opener against the Indianapolis Colts and recorded one tackle. He was released on September 29.

Philadelphia Eagles
Wall was signed to the Philadelphia Eagles' practice squad on September 30, 2010. He was switched to safety and was promoted to the active roster on December 21 after Nate Allen was placed on the injured reserve list. 

He was cut on December 31, but was re-signed to the practice squad on January 3, 2011, before being signed to a future contract on January 13. He was waived on August 29, but was re-signed on September 1, only to be waived again the next day.

Georgia Force
On February 2, 2012, he was signed by the Georgia Force of the Arena Football League.

Calgary Stampeders
On June 10, 2012, Wall signed with the Calgary Stampeders of the Canadian Football League as a free agent, making 12 starts while playing the halfback and cornerback positions. He registered 33 tackles (1 for loss), 3 passes defensed and 2 sacks. 

The next year, he played in 12 games, registered 41 tackles, 2 passes defensed and tied for the team-lead with 4 interceptions (tied for the team lead).

In 2014, he was a part of the Grey Cup winning team and received CFL All-star honors, while finishing with 18 starts, 62 tackles, 6 interceptions (tied for the league lead) and five passes defensed (tied for the team lead). 

The next year, he started all 18 games, posting 70 tackles, 2 interceptions (one returned for a touchdown), 10 passes defensed (led the team) and 2 special teams tackles. He also had one punt return for six yards.

In 2016, he started 17 games at cornerback and one at safety, making 47 tackles (2 for loss), 3 forced fumbles (tied for the team lead), 4 interceptions (led the team), one interception returned for a 60-yard touchdown and 17 passes defensed (led the team). He received West Division and CFL All-star honors.

In 2017, he started 18 games, making 55 tackles (second on the team), 2 interceptions (tied for third on the team), 5 passes defensed, one forced fumble, one fumble recovery. He started in both post-season games, tallying 2 tackles (one for loss) and one quarterback pressure in the Grey Cup game.

Wall re-signed with the Stampeders on January 12, 2021.

References

External links

Texas Tech Red Raiders bio
Calgary Stampeders bio 

1988 births
Living people
People from Plainview, Texas
Players of American football from Texas
American football cornerbacks
Canadian football defensive backs
American football safeties
Texas Tech Red Raiders football players
Dallas Cowboys players
Houston Texans players
Philadelphia Eagles players
Georgia Force players
Calgary Stampeders players
Plainview High School (Texas) alumni